Ilyodon lennoni, the Chacambero splitfin, is a species of splitfin endemic to Mexico.  This species grows to a length of  TL.  It has been considered to be a junior synonym of I. whitei, but is currently considered to be a valid species by Fishbase and the California Academy of Sciences. The specific name honours John Lennon (1940-1980), the singer and guitarist with The Beatles.

See also
 Bumba lennoni
 List of organisms named after famous people (born 1900–1949)

References

lennoni
Fish described in 1983